Mari Kannu Hori Myage also spelled as Maari Kannu Hori Myage is a 1998 Indian Kannada-language comedy film starring Jaggesh, Archana, Utthara and Dheerendra Gopal. The film written and directed by Kumar was named after a famous track from the Kannada film A released in the same year. The movie humorously deals with the troubles of a man from a middle-class family who becomes the victim of a slight misunderstanding. The film edited by T. Shashikumar has soundtrack scored by Rajesh Ramanath and cinematography handled by Sundarnath Suvarna. The film upon release met with positive reception.

Cast 
 Jaggesh as Vaikunta, Annaiah's elder son
 Archana as Soundarya
 Utthara
 Dheerendra Gopal as Annaiah
 Tennis Krishna as Kailasa, Annaiah's Second Son
 Papamma
 Anuradha
 Honnavalli Krishna
 M. S. Umesh
 Bank Janardhan
 Kote Prabhakar as Prabhakar
 Venkatesh
 Reena
 Ravi
 Sindhu Menon
 Mithun Tejasvi

Soundtrack

Reception 
Srikanth Srinivasa of Deccan Herald felt the audience would fail to understand what director Kumar "is trying to convey" with this film. He added, "Kumar, in trying to be different, has neither made good use of the story at his disposal nor has he capitalised on Jaggesh's screen presence, leaving the audience totally at sea." About the acting performances, he wrote, ""Jaggesh is as usual in his element... Uttara has nothing much to do. Dhirendra Gopal is wasted. The dialogues are loud, vulgar and unparliamentary. Papamma is a delight, though her dialogues are atrocious."

See also 
Tarle Nan Maga
Jagath Kiladi
Melkote Manja

References 

1998 films
1990s Kannada-language films